Hudson Rodrigues dos Santos (born 30 January 1988), simply known as Hudson, is a Brazilian former professional footballer. Mainly a defensive midfielder, he also played as a right-back.

Club career
Born in Juiz de Fora, Minas Gerais, Hudson joined Santos' youth setup in 2006. On 13 May of the following year, as all of the starters were resting due to the Copa Libertadores fixtures, he made his first team – and Série A – debut by coming on as a second-half substitute for Vinícius in a 4–1 away loss against Sport; it was his only appearance of the campaign.

After being rarely used, Hudson had loan spells with Santa Cruz, Ituano, Red Bull Brasil and Comercial before joining Oeste on 18 May 2012. He was a regular starter with the latter during their Série C winning campaign.

On 23 May 2013, Hudson signed for Brasiliense, also in the third division. On 19 December he agreed to a contract with Botafogo, on loan until the end of the Campeonato Paulista.

After impressing with Bota during the tournament, Hudson signed a contract with São Paulo on 8 April 2014, until December. He made his debut for the club late in the month, replacing Maicon in a 1–1 away draw against Cruzeiro.

On 17 October 2014 Hudson renewed his contract, signing until December 2017. On 6 December 2016, he further extended his deal for two more seasons.

On 22 December 2016, Hudson joined Cruzeiro on a one-year loan deal, with Neílton moving in the opposite direction. With the club he scored his first goal in the main category the following 9 July, netting the second in a 3–1 home win against Palmeiras.

On January 8, 2020, Hudson was loaned for Fluminense. His contract with Tricolor Carioca runs until December of 2020.

Career statistics

Honours
Fluminense
 Campeonato Carioca: 2020

References

External links
 

1988 births
Living people
People from Juiz de Fora
Brazilian footballers
Association football midfielders
Campeonato Brasileiro Série A players
Campeonato Brasileiro Série C players
Campeonato Brasileiro Série D players
Santos FC players
Santa Cruz Futebol Clube players
Ituano FC players
Red Bull Brasil players
Comercial Futebol Clube (Ribeirão Preto) players
Oeste Futebol Clube players
Brasiliense Futebol Clube players
Botafogo Futebol Clube (SP) players
São Paulo FC players
Cruzeiro Esporte Clube players
Fluminense FC players
Sportspeople from Minas Gerais